John Isner was the defending champion, but decided not to compete this year.

Somdev Devvarman won the tournament, defeating Robert Kendrick in the final, 6–3, 6–3.

Seeds

Draw

Finals

Top half

Bottom half

References 
 Main draw
 Qualifying draw

Fifth Third Bank Tennis Championships - Men's Singles
2008 MS